Dicranales is an order of haplolepideous mosses in the subclass Dicranidae.

References

External links
 McGraw Hill, Dicranales

 
Moss orders